The Seabright Invitational Tournament was a men's and women's grass court tennis tournament staged annually at the Seabright Lawn Tennis and Cricket Club, Rumson, New Jersey, United States from 1884 to 1950.

History
The Seabright Lawn Tennis and Cricket Club is a historic private sports club in Rumson, Monmouth County, New Jersey, United States. It was founded in 1877 and incorporated officially in 1886. In 1884, the club held its first Seabright Invitational Tournament, the men's singles was won Joseph Sill Clark Sr.. The tournament continued to be staged annually until 1889 when it was discontinued.

In 1894 the tournament was reestablished, and in 1920 a women's event was finally added to the schedule. The event was suspended from 1943 to 1945 because of World War II. It resumed in 1946 and continued to be held until 1949. In 1950, the organizing committee of Seabright Lawn Tennis and Cricket Club voted to discontinue the event, due to ongoing cost of the maintenance of the grass courts, and the budget needed to build new permanent spectator seating made it untenable. Contrary to official sources the other reason the tournament was ended was not because of funding, but because the members grew tired of the fuss of organizing the event.

References

1884 establishments in New Jersey
1950 disestablishments in New Jersey
Grass court tennis tournaments
Defunct tennis tournaments in the United States
Rumson, New Jersey
Tennis tournaments in New Jersey